John Anderson Moore (January 12, 1910 – February 26, 1944) was a United States Navy submarine commander who was killed in action during World War II. He had been awarded three Navy Crosses and a Purple Heart Medal before his death. The U.S. Navy frigate  is named in his honor.

Raised in Bisbee, Arizona, Moore had boxed and played soccer at the United States Naval Academy. He served on R- and S-class submarines, before assuming command of the submarine  on its last three patrols during 1943–1944.  Under the overall command of innovator Charles "Swede" Momsen, Grayback, and  launched the U.S. Navy's first attack against enemy shipping using "wolfpack" tactics.  Moore was credited with multiple events of "extraordinary heroism" in repeated forays against Japanese vessels in the East China Sea before being killed during the last of the Graybacks patrols.

References

External links 
 

1910 births
1944 deaths
People from Brownwood, Texas
People from Bisbee, Arizona
United States Naval Academy alumni
United States Navy officers
United States submarine commanders
Recipients of the Navy Cross (United States)
United States Navy personnel killed in World War II
Burials at the Manila American Cemetery
Military personnel from Texas
Military personnel from Arizona